Panos Cosmatos (born February 1, 1974) is an Italian-Canadian film director and screenwriter. He is known for Beyond the Black Rainbow and Mandy.

Life and career 
Cosmatos was born in Italy to Greek-Italian film-maker George P. Cosmatos (whose credits include Rambo: First Blood Part II and Cobra) and Swedish sculptor Birgitta Ljungberg-Cosmatos. The family moved to Victoria, British Columbia, in the early 1980s.

As a child, Cosmatos frequented a video store named Video Attic. During these trips, he would browse the horror and sci-fi sections looking at the covers of films he was not allowed to watch, instead imagining what these films were like.

His first break in the film industry was being a second unit video assist operator for his father's film Tombstone.

He made his first feature film, Beyond the Black Rainbow (2010), by financing it through D.V.D. residuals from Tombstone.

In 2017, Cosmatos directed the action horror film Mandy, which was produced by Legion M. The film starred Nicolas Cage and Andrea Riseborough. It premiered at the 2018 Sundance Film Festival on January 19, and began a limited cinematic release and V.O.D. play on September 14, 2018.

He is married to Andrea Cosmatos.

Themes 
The director admits a dislike for Baby Boomers' New Age spiritual ideals, an issue he addresses in Beyond the Black Rainbow. The use of psychedelic drugs for mind-expansion purposes is also explored, although Cosmatos' take on it is "dark and disturbing", a "brand of psychedelia that stands in direct opposition to the flower child, magic mushroom peace trip" wrote a reviewer describing one of the characters who happened to be a Boomer:

Filmography 
Film

Television

References

External links 
 

1974 births
Living people
Canadian male screenwriters
Canadian people of Swedish descent
Canadian people of Greek descent
Film directors from Rome
Film directors from Victoria, British Columbia
Screenwriters from British Columbia
Writers from Victoria, British Columbia
21st-century Canadian screenwriters